Tere Pyar Mein (Urdu: تیرے پیار میں) (lit: In Your Love) is a Pakistani film which was released in December 2000. It launched the career of Zara Sheikh in Lollywood.

Plot
The story is about a young Indian Sikh girl Preety played by Zara Sheikh,   who goes to the historic city of Lahore, Pakistan for a religious pilgrimage of a Sikh holy place there with her father. A Pakistani boy named Ali (Shaan), who is a banker, falls in love with her. After the pilgrimage, she goes back to her country. Ali realizes that he feels lost without her and goes after her. They both are delighted to see each other, but Preety's friend in India, who is also in the Indian Army, is not able to deal with  Preety falling in love with a Pakistani as he wants to marry her. He sends his forces after the two lovers as they spy for Pakistan. The couple flees, and after days of hide and seek, Ali is barely able to destroy the Indian Army cars following them. In the last scene, the lovers arrive at the Pakistan-India border, where they see a Pakistani Flag, and their emotions are filled with joy.

Film business
This film celebrated its 'diamond jubilee' (one year running), a highly successful movie.

Soundtrack
The music is composed by Amjad Bobby, film song lyrics by Riaz ur Rehman Saghar and Aqeel Ruby

 "Kal Thi Mohabbat" - Hema Sardesai
 "Aasman Ko Lagane Haath Main" - Kavita Krishnamurthy
 "Haath Se Haath Kia Gaya - Duet" - Humaira Channa, Sonu Nigam
 "Haath Se Haath Kia Gaya - Male" - Sonu Nigam
 "Nikli Ghar Se" - Jaspinder Narula
 "Sangam Hua" - Kavita Krishnamurthy
 "Dum Ishq Da Yaara" - Jaspinder Narula

Cast
 Shaan as Ali 
 Zara Sheikh as Preeti
 Veena Malik as Amina
 Noor Bukhari
 Irfan Khoosat
 Raza as  major narain
 Raja Riaz as Balbir singh 
 Rashid Mehmood

Awards

References

External links
 

2000s Urdu-language films
2000 films
Pakistani action drama films
Films set in Lahore
Pakistani romantic drama films
Nigar Award winners